Proposition U was a ballot initiative for the city of Los Angeles. Proposed by Zev Yaroslavsky, Joel Wachs, and Marvin Braude, and placed on the ballot in November 1986, Prop. U aimed to slow development in the city. Voters approved Prop. U by a 2-1 margin.

Aim
Prop. U aimed to slow the development of high rises in the city. While the downtown business core was exempt from Prop. U, the proposition established density levels for other areas of the city. Prop. U also specifically reduced the allowable size of new buildings on 70-85 percent of the commercial and industrial areas of Los Angeles by one-half.

Supporters and critics
Prop. U was supported by local political groups, such as Not Yet New York. Although Prop. U had no organized opposition, critics included developers and members of the city council, who argued that the measure would cost jobs. In an opinion piece for the Los Angeles Times, one critic called the measure too broad.

Passage
Seven out of ten LA voters voted "yes" on Prop. U. Passage was strongest in South-Central and East Los Angeles.

Legacy
Prop. U is still considered a core rule by which builders in the Los Angeles area have to abide when constructing new office buildings, but limits for residential construction have been eased by the passage of Measure JJJ, which encourages density and affordable housing near transit hubs.

See also

Measure S, failed 2017 initiative proposing similar limits on development in the city

References

1986 California ballot propositions
Elections in Los Angeles
Urban planning in California
1986 in Los Angeles
November 1986 events in the United States